The Laa Formation is a geologic formation in Austria. It preserves fossils dating back to the Langhian stage of the Miocene period.

See also 
 List of fossiliferous stratigraphic units in Austria

References 

Geologic formations of Austria
Miocene Series of Europe
Neogene Austria
Langhian
Paleontology in Austria